The men's high jump event at the 2019 African Games was held on 30 August in Rabat.

Results

References

High
African Games